The Avatar is the main player character and protagonist in the Ultima series of video games by Origin Systems. The character was first introduced as "The Stranger" in the 1981 role-playing video game Ultima I: The First Age of Darkness.

Appearances
The Avatar was first known as the Stranger (or Stranger from another world) in Ultima I, when he rid the world of the evil wizard Mondain, later returning to bring an end to the wicked sorceress Minax in Ultima II: The Revenge of the Enchantress and to dispatch their legacy in Ultima III: Exodus.  Ultima IV: Quest of the Avatar included The History of Britannia, which did not state whether the heroes from the first three games or the current one were the same person or not, leaving it rather vague.  Later games imply that the Stranger and the Avatar are the same person.

While in later games the player character follows a set of ethic guidelines called the Virtues, in the first three games the player is not bound by any moral guidelines, leaving the future Avatar free to steal and murder, with only the easily avoided town guards to stop them.  The first three games were much easier if the player chose to steal food in order to survive, rather than purchase it. The fourth time the Stranger returns, his quest focuses on a different task. Instead of defeating an enemy, his goal is to follow the path of the Virtues, and retrieve the Codex of Ultimate Wisdom from the Great Stygian Abyss. In the fifth episode, the Avatar defeats a repressive regime in Britannia, and in the sixth, he brings peace between men and gargoyles. Beginning with Ultima VII, the Avatar battles the Guardian, finally destroying both himself and his foe in Ultima IX: Ascension.

In all of the Ultima games except for Ultima IX: Ascension, the player can choose the Avatar's name. As the first three Ultima games had many Tolkien-inspired elements, the Stranger could be a non-human race, such as an elf or a dwarf. Until Ultima VIII: Pagan, the gender could be chosen as well; Ultima III even allowed for a non-binary gender. In most later games, several different character portraits with different skin and hair colors are available. The Avatar sprite is determined by class in early games, and always the same in Ultima V: Warriors of Destiny and Ultima VI: The False Prophet. Ultima VII and Ultima: Worlds of Adventure 2: Martian Dreams have two different sprites, one for each gender. In Ultima VIII: Pagan and IX, there is no choice in gender, portrait or sprite/3D model – the character is male with blond hair and blue eyes.

The Avatar's clothing generally includes a chain mail hauberk, with a white, red, or orange tunic (with a golden Ankh symbol on the chest and back) over it, and a red cape. Typically, he or she is shown wielding a sword. His or her appearance varies from game to game and version to version, but usually follows this schema. In Ultima VIII, the Avatar's face is obscured by a large helmet.

In Ultima I to III, no speech by the Stranger was ever shown.  In Ultima IV and onward, the player must choose keywords to engage in conversations. Thus, the other characters discuss things with the Avatar, but apart from the topic, the player never sees what the Avatar actually says. The dialogue choices available in conversation with every character are "name" (asking the character to introduce themselves), "job" (asking the character to describe their position in the community), and "bye" (ending the conversation). This is parodied in Ultima VII, where an actor playing the Avatar in a play boasts about how he has hundreds of lines to memorize, only to reveal that every line literally consists of "Name!", "Job!", or "Bye!". The first time the Avatar actually speaks directly is in Ultima VII, but full lines are very rare and only appear in one or two instances. Ultima Underworld broke this tradition by being the first Ultima to give the Avatar full dialogue throughout the game; Ultima IX would later follow this tradition, adding digitized speech to accompany the text.

Development
Ultima creator Richard Garriott stated that after Ultima III he received hate mail from parents, bringing his attention to the fact that in his first three Ultima games immoral actions like stealing and murder of peaceful citizens had been tacitly condoned. There was also criticism about supposed Satanic content in media at that time, making the demonic nature of the antagonist of Ultima III and its picture on the box art an easy target. The official biographer of Richard Garriott, Shay Addams, wrote: "He decided that if people were going to look for hidden meaning in his work when they didn't even exist, he would introduce ideas and symbols with meaning and significance he deemed worthwhile, to give them something they could really think about." Watching a television show on Hinduism, and the 16 virtues necessary to lead one to the state of Avatar-hood, he decided to adopt these elements into the game, creating the eight virtue system and borrowing the title for the protagonist, the Avatar.

By the time of Ultima VII, Richard Garriott noted that he had grown tired of the moral concept seen in the previous three games, and the Avatar returned to a more traditional role for the player where the moral code was not as strictly enforced. The Avatar in Ultima VIII was designed to be male, taking away the choice of gender, but still having some of the moral flexibility seen in prior titles. Ultima X: Odyssey promised to return to the character development of achieving Avatar status, but the project was ultimately cancelled.

Reception
In 1996, Computer Gaming World ranked the Avatar as sixth on the list of the most memorable game heroes, adding that "the anonymous hero of most of the Ultima sagas was particularly interesting when trying to balance the virtues." GameSpot listed Avatar among the ten best heroes in video gaming, commenting: "In the minds of many longtime Ultima fans, identifying this timeless character by a face – and removing your ability to imagine his visage, or project yourself into the role – was a careless mistake on Origin's behalf. In Ultima V, the Avatar was more than a hero, he was a projection of yourself. Sadly, now he has become someone else – just another hero out to rid the land of evil." In 2008, IGN included him on the list of characters they would like to see in an ultimate fighting game, adding: "The Avatar may not be the first RPG adventure hero, but he's certainly the most memorable of the early gaming era."

Cultural impact
The use of the word "avatar" in this manner is the first time that the word represented a concept defined by its modern virtual context. It is not an embodiment of a god but of the virtues inherent to the game's paradigm. From Ultima IV onward, the player must consider and reflect upon the Avatar's actions, bringing them in line with such Virtues. Since the games in the series focus on spiritual growth and seek to share virtuous ideas with the players as well, the implication behind the Avatar character is that it is representative of the actual player in the "real world". As part of this focus, players for the first time in the history of the medium were able to choose the gender and race of their characters. The Avatar concept also pioneered a role-playing game (RPG) video game design where the player has control over a single character and subsequently builds a party of followers from pre-existing non-player characters.

The Avatar character makes a cameo appearance as the last heroic adversary in Dungeon Keeper (also released by Electronic Arts but developed by a different subsidiary, Bullfrog Productions) and is humorously included in the last cutscene as being locked in a wall for knife-throwing target practice for a Horned Reaper. The Ultima series' spiritual successor game was named Shroud of the Avatar: Forsaken Virtues.

References

External links
Avatar and the Stranger at the Codex of Ultima Wisdom, a wiki for Ultima

Fantasy video game characters
Role-playing video game characters
Science fantasy video game characters
Ultima characters
Video game characters introduced in 1981
Video game characters of selectable gender
Video game protagonists